The Cure for Insomnia is a 1987 experimental film directed by John Henry Timmis IV, which was, according to Guinness World Records, the longest running film. At 5,220 minutes long (87 hours, or 3 days and 15 hours) in length, the film has no plot, instead consisting of artist L. D. Groban reading his 4,080-page poem A Cure for Insomnia over the course of three and a half days, spliced with occasional clips from heavy metal and pornographic videos.

It was first played in its entirety at The School of the Art Institute in Chicago, Illinois, from January 31 to February 3, 1987, in one continuous showing. It has not been released on DVD or other home video formats and all known copies are considered as lost.

See also
 List of longest films by running time

References

External links

American avant-garde and experimental films
1987 films
Art Institute of Chicago
American independent films
Films based on poems
1980s pornographic films
Heavy metal films
American anthology films
Lost American films
Compilation films
1980s avant-garde and experimental films
1987 independent films
1980s English-language films
1980s American films